Joe Reboledo (born 27 March 1983) is a Uruguayan rower. He competed in the men's lightweight double sculls event at the 2004 Summer Olympics.

References

1983 births
Living people
Uruguayan male rowers
Olympic rowers of Uruguay
Rowers at the 2004 Summer Olympics
Sportspeople from Montevideo
21st-century Uruguayan people